Sydney Fast Ferries operated high-speed ferry services on Port Jackson between Circular Quay and Manly from April 2010 until March 2015.

History
Since January 1965, the Port Jackson & Manly Steamship Company and its successors had operated high speed hydrofoil and later JetCat services between Circular Quay and Manly.

In December 2008, the New South Wales State Government, decided the Sydney Ferries service would cease and called for tenders to operate the service on a commercial basis.

Bass & Flinders Cruises trading as Manly Fast Ferry commenced operating the service on 10 February 2009 on an interim basis until March 2010.

In April 2010, Sydney Fast Ferries commenced a five-year franchise to operate the service. However, Manly Fast Ferries continued to operate services between Circular Quay Wharf 6 and Manly East Pier via Fort Denison, Taronga Zoo and Watsons Bay.

In July 2014, expressions of interest were sought for the next franchise with Bass & Flinders Cruises, SeaLink Travel Group, Sydney Fast Ferries and Transit Systems responding. In December 2014, the franchise was awarded to Bass & Flinders Cruises, with Sydney Fast Ferries ceasing operations on 31 March 2015. Sydney Fast Ferries lodged a complaint in March 2015 that the selection process was not handled correctly by Transport for New South Wales.

They continued to operate cruises under the name Sydney Adventure Cruises. However, since January 2016 their website has redirected to the Captain Cook Cruises, Australia website.

References

Ferry companies of New South Wales
Ferry transport in Sydney
Australian companies established in 2010
Transport companies established in 2010
Australian companies disestablished in 2015
Transport companies disestablished in 2015